The Cuban National Series (SNB) is the primary domestic professional baseball competition in Cuba. Formed after the dissolution of the Cuban League in the wake of the Cuban Revolution, the Series is a part of the Cuban baseball league system.

League structure

Since 1993, the league has had 16 teams: one representing each province, and one for the city of Havana. Each team is made up of players from the province it represents.

In Havana, most of the top tier players take the field for Industriales, traditionally the strongest team in the league. Other typically strong teams include those from Santiago de Cuba, Pinar del Río and Villa Clara.

The 96-game regular season stretches from early August until late January, split into two halves – the fall period stretches from August to early October and the winter period from late October to early January the following year, and culminates with a six team postseason tournament in January to decide the league champion.

In the 2008–2009 season, the Cuban League was reorganized to determine playoff qualification by zones rather than groups, as it had been the previous 15 years. The two zones represented the country's geography, with teams split into Western and Eastern Zone divisions.

In the 2011–2012 series, there were 17 competing teams, since Havana Province was split into two: Artemisa Province and Mayabeque Province. Thus, the Western League had nine teams, including the two new clubs, the Artemisa Cazadores ("Hunters") and the Mayabeque Huracanes ("Hurricanes"). The CNS dropped to 16 teams beginning with the 2012–13 season when the Metropolitanos (long seen as the "farm club" of the powerhouse Industriales) dropped out.

In the 2012–13 season, the zone qualification format was dropped in favor of a phase qualification system. All teams would play 45 games in the "classification phase". The top 8 ranked teams from this phase would move on to the "qualification phase", which determines the playoff participants. In the 2016–17 season, the number of teams in the qualification phase was dropped to six. In the 2020–21 season, the phase format was removed from the league, and the league determined qualifiers based on a single table of standings, with the top teams at the end of the regular season advancing to the postseason, thereby ending divisional play.

The Cuban National Series also serves as the first stage in the selection of players for the Cuba national baseball team, for international competitions during the summer as well as for the World Baseball Classic and the Olympics (1992–2008 and from 2020 onward). The Cuban National Team Preseleccion is selected from the Series and practices in Havana. Sometimes more than one team can be asked to select players for international duty as part of the national team.

To accommodate the 2013 World Baseball Classic, the league took a six-week break after the February 3rd All-Star Game. The CNS played a shortened 45-game season, with all 16 teams competing in a single table format (doing away with the regular two division format). The bottom eight seeded teams then played amongst themselves in the consolation round, while the top eight did the same for the championship. In 2014, the consolation round format for the midseason was officially adopted, effectively making it a de facto wild card game with the winners having a chance to make it to the postseason.

The designated hitter is used in all games. The CNS All Star Game is held yearly midseason of the regular season.

Teams

National Series champions

See also

Cuban League
Cuban National Series Most Valuable Player Award
Cuban National Series Rookie of the Year Award
Baseball awards#Cuba
List of organized baseball leagues

References

External links
Cuban baseball
Connor, Joe, Welcome to Cuba. ESPN (MLB), January 17, 2006. Retrieved 2009-12-16.
Baseball in Cuba The Cuban National Series. Games and stats.
Baseball de Cuba Daily league coverage. English and Spanish content.

 
National
Winter baseball leagues
Recurring sporting events established in 1961
Professional sports leagues in Cuba